Alessandro Orlando (born 1 June 1970) is an Italian former professional footballer who played a defender.

A quick, talented, energetic, and dynamic offensive left-back, with a powerful shot and good technique, he excelled at providing long passes and crosses to forwards and at making attacking runs down the flank. Despite his offensive and creative prowess, he was inconsistent at times, however, and was less effective defensively, as he often struggled in one on one situations with forwards. A predominantly left-footed player, he was also an accurate free-kick taker.

Although he was often a reserve player at Milan and Juventus, Orlando is one of the six players to win the Serie A title in two successive years with different clubs, winning the 1993–94 Serie A title with Milan, and the 1994–95 Serie A title with Juventus; the other five are Giovanni Ferrari, Riccardo Toros, Eraldo Mancin, Roberto Baggio, and Andrea Pirlo.

Club career

Early career
After beginning his career in the Udinese Youth side, Orlando made 3 appearances in the Udinese senior side during the 1987–88 and the 1988–89 Serie B seasons. He was subsequently loaned to Parma, making 13 appearances and scoring a goal, also managing Serie A promotion during the 1989–90 season. At the end of his loan contract, he returned to Udinese making 30 appearances in Serie B.

He began to draw attention from larger Serie A clubs, and during the summer of 1991, he was purchased by Sampdoria. He made his Serie A debut with the club on 1 September 1991, in a 3–2 away defeat to Cagliari, although he was unable to break into the starting line-up, making 14 appearances in Serie A, and scoring 1 goal in a home victory over Parma on 1 March 1992, winning the 1991 Supercoppa Italiana with the club. He also made 5 appearances in the UEFA Champions League, as Sampdoria went on to reach the final, only to be defeated by Cruyff's Barcelona "Dream Team". The next season, he returned to his former club, Udinese, who had just achieved promotion to Serie A, making 29 appearances throughout the season.

Success with Milan, Juventus and Fiorentina
In 1993, Orlando was purchased by Italian and European giants A.C. Milan for 3.2 billion Lit. With the club, he made 15 appearances in Serie A under manager Fabio Capello, and 6 in the UEFA Champions League, as Milan went on to win both competitions, as well as the Supercoppa Italiana; he notably managed a goal in the Champions League, scoring in Milan's 6–0 away victory over FC Copenhagen. Orlando also made 4 appearances in the Coppa Italia that season for Milan, making 25 appearances in total in all competitions.

He began the following season with Milan, but was sold to Juventus at the end of the transfer window in exchange for creative forward and attacking midfielder Paolo Di Canio. Orlando made 13 appearances for the Turin club in Serie A that season, serving as a back-up to Robert Jarni, as he managed to win his second consecutive Serie A title. He also managed to capture the Coppa Italia with Juventus that season, making five appearances; Juventus also went on to reach the 1995 UEFA Cup Final, only to be defeated by Parma. Despite his success, his inability to break into the starting line-up yet again led to his transfer to Fiorentina, where he appeared even less frequently than in previous seasons. He made only seven appearances in Serie A with the Florentine club that season, and one more in the Coppa Italia, a trophy which Fiorentina would go on to win.

Return to Udinese and later career
Orlando returned to Udinese for the 1996–97 season, where he made 22 appearances, helping the club to a fifth-place finish in Serie A. He was sold to newly promoted club Treviso in Serie B the following season, after making two appearances with Udinese. He spent two seasons with Treviso in Serie B, scoring 5 goals in 50 appearances. In the summer of 2000, he moved to Cagliari, where he only made eight appearances throughout his only season at the club, later moving to Padova in Serie C1. He played two seasons with the club, making 42 appearances, without scoring a goal. He subsequently moved to Pordenone and later Cologna Veneta. In 2004, he was signed by Serie D club Tamai, where he spent three seasons, before spending the final season of his career with Manzanese, where he retired after the 2007–08 season.

In total he made 102 career appearances In Serie A, scoring 1 goal, and 104 appearances in Serie B, scoring 5 goals.

International career
Although Orlando never appeared for the Italy senior side, he made one appearance with the Italy under-21 side on 29 January 1992, in an away fixture against Greece. He represented Italy at the 1992 Summer Olympics, although he never made appearance throughout the tournament, only playing in the pre-olympic friendly against Egypt.

Coaching career
In 2008, Orlando was hired as a player-manager for A.S.D. Flumiganio, a lower-division team in the Promozione League in Friuli-Venezia Giulia. In June 2013, after his fifth season, he left the club. Starting from the 2013–14 season, he was named player-manager of the Friulian Promozione side A.S.D. Svegliano.

Honours

Club
Sampdoria
 Supercoppa Italiana: 1991.

A.C. Milan
 Serie A: 1993–94. 
 Supercoppa Italiana: 1994.
 UEFA Champions League: 1993–94.

Juventus
 Serie A: 1994–95. 
 Coppa Italia: 1994–95.

Fiorentina
 Coppa Italia: 1995–96.

References

External links
 Career summary by playerhistory.com

1970 births
Living people
Sportspeople from Udine
Italian footballers
Italy under-21 international footballers
Serie A players
Serie B players
Serie C players
Footballers at the 1992 Summer Olympics
Olympic footballers of Italy
Udinese Calcio players
Parma Calcio 1913 players
U.C. Sampdoria players
A.C. Milan players
Juventus F.C. players
ACF Fiorentina players
Treviso F.B.C. 1993 players
Cagliari Calcio players
Calcio Padova players
Association football defenders
Footballers from Friuli Venezia Giulia